Dasychira moerens is a moth of the family Erebidae first described by Felder in 1894. It is found in South India and Sri Lanka.

The caterpillar is known to feed on Rosa, Theobroma cacao, Smilax and Vitis species.

References

Moths of Asia
Moths described in 1894